Aphanomyces raphani is a fungal plant pathogen.

References

External links

Water mould plant pathogens and diseases
Saprolegniales
Species described in 1927